The 2019 Rugby Europe Women's Sevens Olympic Qualifying Tournament was held on 13–14 July in Kazan at Central Stadium. The champion of the tournament will be eligible to qualify for the European spot in the 2020 Summer Olympics. The two runners-up will be eligible for bids at a 2020 Olympic repechage tournament.

Teams

Twelve teams take part in the tournament, of which seven teams qualified through the 2019 Marcoussis Sevens, and are seeded according to their placements. The remaining five spots were awarded based upon performance in the Trophy and Conference tournaments.

Seedings

  (Marcoussis winner)
  (Marcoussis runner-up)
  (Marcoussis 3rd)
  (Marcoussis 4th)
  (Marcoussis 5th)
  (Marcoussis 7th)
  (Marcoussis 9th)
  (Trophy winner)
  (Trophy runner-up)
  (Trophy 3rd)
  (Trophy 5th)
  (Conference winner)

Note

Pool stage
All times in Moscow Time (UTC+03:00)

Pool A

Pool B

Pool C

Knockout stage

Bowl

Plate

Cup

Standings

External links
 Tournament page

References

Europe
2019 rugby sevens competitions
2019 in women's rugby union
International rugby union competitions hosted by Russia
2019 in Russian rugby union
July 2019 sports events in Russia